Naanalla is a 2011 Indian Kannada-language murder mystery film directed by Dinesh Baboo and starring Tarun Chandra, Shubha Poonja and Ananth Nag. The film is inspired by the Hindi film Deewangee (2002), which itself was based on the English film Primal Fear (1996).

Cast 
Tarun Chandra as Siddharth 
Shubha Poonja as Bhavya
Anant Nag as Subhash Chandra Prasad
Kushboo as Subhash Chandra Prasad's wife
Rangayana Raghu as Prathap
Sihi Kahi Chandru as Melmane

Production 
Tarun Chandra took a break from his romantic films with this thriller film.

Reception 
A critic from The Times of India wrote that "Director Dinesh Baboo has done a marvelous job with the script. He’s set an example of how best a thriller can be made without spoiling the story — a rarity in Kannada cinema". A critic from the IANS wrote that "It is an engaging tale with a brilliant narration coupled with finely tuned performances". A critic from Bangalore Mirror wrote that the film "is an engrossing watch for all kinds of audience".

References 

Indian remakes of American films